Łękanów  is a village in the administrative district of Gmina Niechlów, within Góra County, Lower Silesian Voivodeship, in south-western Poland. Prior to 1945 it was in Germany.

History and landmarks

From the 14th century, the village has been known under various names, which included Lankanow and Lanka. Before World War II, the village was called Lanken and was part of the German district of Lower Silesia and property of Counts of Schlabrendorf, who had a majorat in the palace of Seppau, some 20 kilometers away. Between 1860 and 1945 the village served as an auxiliary residence of the counts, who had a manor house (referred to in German as Schloss, meaning palace or castle) built at the western outskirts of Lanken.

In 1945, borders shifted at the end of the war and the region became part of Poland. The name was changed to Łękanów and the Schlabrendorfs were expropriated. The manor was divided and parts of it were given to a collective farm run by the state. By the time communism collapsed in 1989, the manor house and outbuildings had been heavily transformed, with the manor house turned into apartments for collective farm staff.

A state-owned agency which owned the remnants of the manor—more than six hectares of land and buildings—sold it in 2013 to a private owner who plans to restore the manor house to its 19th-century shape, renovate the outbuildings as well as rebuild ruined structures to house a hotel. Part of the property, in particular an 18th-century granary, will house a nonprofit cultural institution.

The manor in its entirety is a listed heritage site.

References

Villages in Góra County